Kohneh Sara may refer to:
 Kohneh Sara, Gilan
 Kohneh Sara, Mazandaran